Sara Olsvig (born 26 September 1978) is a Greenlandic politician and former leader (2014–2018) of the Inuit Ataqatigiit political party. She occupied one of Greenland's two seats in the Danish Folketing, 15 September 2011 – 15 September 2014.

As of 2022, she is chair of the Inuit Circumpolar Council.

References

External links

www.IA.gl
ia.gl/sara-olsvig
www.iafolketingimi.dk (IA in the Danish Parliament)
 
twitter.com/SaraOlsvig
facebook.com/IAsaraolsvig

1978 births
Living people
Greenlandic Inuit people
Greenlandic people of Danish descent
Women members of the Parliament of Greenland
Members of the Parliament of Greenland
Members of the Folketing 2011–2015
People from Nuuk
Inuit Ataqatigiit politicians
University of Copenhagen alumni
21st-century Danish women politicians
Women members of the Folketing
Greenlandic members of the Folketing